Phillip Emanuel (1946–2011) was an Australian film producer.

Select Credits
The Wild Duck (1984)
Rebel (1985)
Takeover (1987)
Those Dear Departed (1987)
Two Brothers Running (1988)
Kokoda Crescent (1989)
Weekend with Kate (1990)
Fatal Past (1993)
Point of No Return (1994)
Girl (1994)
Rainbow's End (1995)
Offspring (1996)
A Divided Heart (2005)

External links

Online tribute
Phillip Emanuel at TCMDB

Australian film producers
1946 births
2011 deaths